Bifid refers to something that is split or cleft into two parts.  It may refer to:

 Bifid, a variation in the P wave, R wave, or T wave in an echocardiogram in which a wave which usually has a single peak instead has two separate peaks
 Bifid cipher, a type of cipher in cryptography
 Bifid penis
 Bifid rib, a congenital abnormality of the human anatomy